Jennifer Paes (née Dutton) is a former basketball player from India who captained the Indian national basketball team in 1982 and participated in the 1972 Summer Olympics. She is mother of Leander Paes, India's top tennis player, and the wife of India's former field hockey player Vece Paes.
Jennifer is the daughter of Michael Dutton and Ruby Myrtle Nyss of Calcutta and great-granddaughter of Bengali poet Michael Madhusudan Dutt. Her uncle Garney Nyss was an accomplished sportsman in multiple sports including field hockey,  speed skating, athletics, cricket, badminton and tennis.

References

External links
Ministry of Sports and Affairs, Government of India

Year of birth missing (living people)
Living people
Indian women's basketball players
Sportspeople from Kolkata
Bengali people
Sportswomen from Kolkata
20th-century Indian women
20th-century Indian people
Basketball players from West Bengal